Mark V. Shaney is a synthetic Usenet user whose postings in the net.singles newsgroups were generated by Markov chain techniques, based on text from other postings.  The username is a play on the words "Markov chain".  Many readers were fooled into thinking that the quirky, sometimes uncannily topical posts were written by a real person.

The system was designed by Rob Pike with coding by Bruce Ellis.  Don P. Mitchell wrote the Markov chain code, initially demonstrating it to Pike and Ellis using the Tao Te Ching as a basis.  They chose to apply it to the net.singles netnews group.

Examples
A classic example, from 1984, originally sent as a mail message, later posted to net.singles is reproduced here:

Other quotations from Mark's Usenet posts are:

"I spent an interesting evening recently with a grain of salt." (Alternatively reported as "While at a conference a few weeks back, I spent an interesting evening with a grain of salt.")
"I hope that there are sour apples in every bushel."

History
In The Usenet Handbook Mark Harrison writes that after September 1981, students joined Usenet en masse, "creating the USENET we know today: endless dumb questions, endless idiots posing as savants, and (of course) endless victims for practical jokes." In December, Rob Pike created the netnews group net.suicide as prank, "a forum for bad jokes". Some users thought it was a legitimate forum, some discussed "riding motorcycles without helmets". At first, most posters were "real people", but soon "characters" began posting. Pike created a "vicious" character named Bimmler. At its peak, net.suicide had ten frequent posters; nine were "known to be characters."  But ultimately, Pike deleted the newsgroup because it was too much work to maintain; Bimmler messages were created "by hand". The "obvious alternative" was software, running on a Bell Labs computer created by Bruce Ellis, based on the Markov code by Don Mitchell, which became the online character Mark V. Shaney.

Kernighan and Pike listed Mark V. Shaney in the acknowledgements in The Practice of Programming, noting its roots in Mitchell's markov, which, adapted as shaney, was used for "humorous deconstructionist activities" in the 1980s.

Dewdney pointed out "perhaps Mark V. Shaney's magnum opus: a 20-page commentary on the deconstructionist philosophy of Jean Baudrillard" directed by Pike, with assistance from Henry S. Baird and Catherine Richards, to be distributed by email. The piece was based on Jean Baudrillard's "The Precession of Simulacra", published in Simulacra and Simulation (1981).

Reception
The program was discussed by A. K. Dewdney in the Scientific American "Computer Recreations" column in 1989, by Penn Jillette in his PC Computing column in 1991, and in several books, including the Usenet Handbook, Bots: the Origin of New Species, Hippo Eats Dwarf: A Field Guide to Hoaxes and Other B.S., and non-computer-related journals such as Texas Studies in Literature and Language.

Dewdney wrote about the program's output, "The overall impression is not unlike what remains in the brain of an inattentive student after a late-night study session. Indeed, after reading the output of Mark V. Shaney, I find ordinary writing almost equally strange and incomprehensible!"  He noted the reactions of newsgroup users, who have "shuddered at Mark V. Shaney's reflections, some with rage and others with laughter:" 
The opinions of the new net.singles correspondent drew mixed reviews. Serious users of the bulletin board's services sensed satire.  Outraged, they urged that someone "pull the plug" on Mark V. Shaney's monstrous rantings. Others inquired almost admiringly whether the program was a secret artificial intelligence project that was being tested in a human conversational environment.  A few may even have thought that Mark V. Shaney was a real person, a tortured schizophrenic desperately seeking a like-minded companion. 
Concluding, Dewdney wrote, "If the purpose of computer prose is to fool people into thinking that it was written by a sane person, Mark V. Shaney probably falls short."

See also
Turing test
Dissociated press
On the Internet, nobody knows you're a dog
Parody generator

References

External links
 FAQ for the Plan 9 operating system by Mark V. Shaney 
 Unofficial biography
 "Mark V. Shaney at Your Service" online version by Yisong Yue.
 "Mark V. Shaney in Common Lisp" at Racine Systems.
 Every Mark V. Shaney post at Google Groups Usenet archive.
 "Sable Debutante's Journal", a Mark V. Shaney clone at LiveJournal
 markovtxt.c, markov.c C source code at Bell Labs

Shaney, Mark V
Novelty software
Random text generation
Markov models
Chatbots